Mazarunia is a genus of cichlids from the Mazaruni River, a tributary of the Essequibo River in Guyana. They are dwarf cichlids that do not surpass  in length.

Species
There are three species:

 Mazarunia charadrica López-Fernández, Taphorn & Liverpool, 2012
 Mazarunia mazarunii S. O. Kullander, 1990
 Mazarunia pala López-Fernández, Taphorn & Liverpool, 2012

References

Geophagini
Fish of South America
Taxa named by Sven O. Kullander